The Main Street Historic District is located in Whitewater, Wisconsin.

Description
The district is made up of a prestigious residential neighborhood between the central downtown and the UW, including the c.1847 Gothic Revival O'Connor house,  the 1856 Italian Villa-style Smith-Allen house, the 1851/1878 Second Empire Kinney-Cox house, the 1882 Romanesque Revival First Congregational Church, the 1895 Queen Anne Engebretsen-Dorr house, the 1903 Birge fountain, and the 1904 Neoclassical White Memorial Library.

References

Historic districts on the National Register of Historic Places in Wisconsin
National Register of Historic Places in Walworth County, Wisconsin